Zhao Yao (Chinese language: 赵要, born 1981 in Sichuan, China) is an artist in installations as well as performance, video and photography. He grew up in Sichuan and currently lives and works in Beijing.

Background 

Zhao Yao was born in Sichuan, China in 1981 and graduated from the Design Arts Department of the Sichuan Fine Arts Institute in 2004 with a bachelor's degree. He currently lives and works in Beijing. Having received much attention in his first solo exhibition in 2010, Zhao Yao has made a significant influence upon the art world with his second and third solo exhibitions I am Your Night and You Can’t See Me, You Can’t See Me. He has become an increasingly important figure in the emerging generation of the contemporary art world in China. Zhao Yao’s works involve an extremely broad range of creative media, including installation, performance, video, painting, sculptures and many others, in which he forges a haptic dissonance, dislocating mundane and spiritual, sight and touch, at once ancient, contemporary, and futuristic, and manifesting the material energies of yet-to-be-named rituals. His works display a sense of humor and confidence, tranquil yet full of tension, skillfully balancing between form and content. Through solo exhibitions, he has approached the vested exhibition system utilising a logic of interference and subversion to break down the framework of the contemporary art structure. For instance, his most recent series of works A Painting of Thought have a great sense of mission that approaches fundamental questions of art from the perspective of painting, particularly abstract painting. Unlike conceptual art in the general sense, this series is not expressing certain criticisms or concepts but instead practicing criticisms or concepts.
His work has also been exhibited at Tate Modern (London, 2010), Fremantle Arts Centre (Australia, 2011), Rubell Family Collection (Miami, 2013), Eli and Edythe Broad Art Museum (Michigan, 2013), Pinchuk Art Centre (Ukraine, 2013), ZKM Center for Art and Media Karlsruhe (Germany, 2013), and Ullens Center for Contemporary Art (Beijing, 2013). Most recently, he was selected to participate in “Focus Beijing: the De Heus-Zomer Collection” at the Museum Boijmans Van Beuningen (Nederland, 2014), “Inside China” at the Palais de Tokyo (Paris, 2014), and "Adventures of the Black Square:Abstract Art and Society 1915–2015" at Whitechapel Gallery (London, 2015).

Selected solo exhibitions 
2015 "Painting of Thought", Pace Hong Kong, Hong Kong
2013 "Spirit above All", Pace London, London, UK
2012 "Zhao Yao: You Can't See Me, You Can't See Me, Beijing Commune", Beijing, China
2011 "Zhao Yao: I am Your Night", Beijing Commune, Beijing, China
2010 "51m2: 3# Zhao Yao, Taikang Space", Beijing, China

Selected group exhibitions 
2015
 Adventures of the Black Square, Whitechapel Gallery, London, UK
2014
 Inside China, Palais de Tokyo, Paris, France
 2014 Asia Triennial Manchester 14: Harmonious Society, The John Rylands Library, Manchester, UK
 Vitrines Sur I'Art, Project by Palais de Tokyo, Galeries Lafayette, Paris, France
 Focus Beijing: De Heus-Zomer Collection, Museum Boijmans Van Beuningen, Rotterdam, the Netherlands
 For Armory Focus: China, The Armory Show, New York, U.S.A
 2nd CAFAM Biennale: “The Invisible Hand: Curating as Gesture”, CAFAM, Beijing, China
2013
 28 Chinese, Rubell Family Collection / Contemporary Arts Foundation, Miami, U.S.A
 Archipelago, V Art Center No.1 Space, Shanghai, China
 Move on Asia-Video Art in Asia 2002 to 2012, ZKM, Karlsruhe, Germany
 China China, Pinchuk Art Centre, Kyiv, Ukraine
 ON |OFF: China's Young Artists in Concept and Practice, The Ullens Center for Contemporary Art, Beijing, China
2012
 Global Groove, Eli and Edythe Broad Art Museum, Michigan, USA
2011
 The Knife's Edge, Fremantle Arts Centre, Fremantle, Australia
 51m2: 16 Young Artists, Taikang Space, Beijing, China
2010
 Seven Young Artists, Beijing Commune, Beijing, China
 No Soul for Sale, Tate Modern, London, UK
 Move on Asia 2010, Alternative Space LOOP, Seoul, Korea; Para / Site Art Space, Hong Kong, China;
 DISCOVERIES: Re-value, Shanghai Contemporary Art Fair, Shanghai Exhibition Center, Shanghai, China
 Reflection of Minds-MOCA Shanghai Envisage III, Museum Of Contemporary Art, Shanghai, China
 Negotiations: The Second Today's Documents, Today Art Museum, Beijing, China
 Get It Louder: Sharism, Sanlitun SOHO, Beijing, China
 Media Landscape-Zone East, Korean Cultural Centre, London, UK
 Conception as Enzyme, A4 Contemporary Arts Center, Chengdu, China
2009
 Poetic-Daily: Chinese Young Artist Exhibition, the thematic project "Art Unforbidden" of Art Beijing 2009, Beijing, China
 Bourgeoisied Proletariat, Small Production, Shanghai Songjiang Creative Studio, Shanghai, China
 Re-experimentation: a Reaffirmation of Will and Enlightenment-Young Artists Promotional Exhibition, Beijing, China
 Work in Progress: How Do Artists Work, Iberia Center for Contemporary Art, Beijing, China
2008
 The 5th Small Productions Event, Shopping Gallery, Shanghai, China
 Hui Hua Fei Fa Hui, Shanghai, China
 Happy Collider, Dong Ba County, Beijing, China
 Dream & Reality, Moon River Museum of Contemporary Art, Beijing, China
2007
 The Alchemy of Shadows: the Second Lianzhou International Photo Festival (LIPF) 2007, Lianzhou, Guangdong, China
2006
 Entry Gate: Chinese Aesthetics of Heterogeneity, Museum of Contemporary Art, Shanghai, China
 Six Photos and a Small Room, Long March Space, Beijing, China
2005
 Rumor Decor, Video & Photograph Exhibition, DDM Warehouse, Shanghai, China
 Spectacle: 'Century' and 'Paradise'-the Second Chengdu Biennale, Chengdu Century City, Chengdu, China
 Archaeology of the Future, the Second Triennial of Chinese Art, Nanjing Museum, Nanjing, China
2004
 A Plan about Two Cities, Art Exhibition, Chongqing; Hong Kong, China
2003
 Suspense: Video & Photograph Exhibition, Chongqing, China

See also 

Avant-garde
Performance art
Conceptual art
Geometric abstraction
Category:Chinese contemporary artists

References

External links 
 Zhao Yao's page at Beijing Commune 
 Zhao Yao's entry in ARTLINKART 
 Zhao Yao's interview at The Artling
 Zhao Yao's interview at LeCODE
 Zhao Yao's news at Phaidon
 Zhao Yao's news at Leap
 Zhao Yao's news at Whitechapelgallery 
 Zhao Yao's news at Yishu

Living people
Artists from Sichuan
1981 births
Chinese contemporary artists